Ocean Avenue is a major street in Brooklyn, New York that runs generally north-south and occupies the position of East 20th Street in the Brooklyn street grid, with East 19th Street to its west and East 21st Street to its east for most of its path. It runs east of and parallel to Ocean Parkway and Coney Island Avenue for most of its route. Except for a short stretch on the Manhattan Beach peninsula, Ocean Avenue starts in the south at Emmons Avenue in Sheepshead Bay just south of the Belt Parkway and continues north, ending at Flatbush Avenue at Willink Plaza after running for several blocks as the eastern edge of Prospect Park. A footbridge across Sheepshead Bay connects the two "Ocean Avenue" sections.

Public transportation
Ocean Avenue is served by the  New York City Bus routes. There is also a New York City Subway station at Parkside/Ocean Avenues.

References

External links
 Ocean Avenue at Forgotten-NY

Streets in Brooklyn